West Gloucestershire was a parliamentary constituency in Gloucestershire, represented in the House of Commons of the Parliament of the United Kingdom.

It was first created by the Great Reform Act for the 1832 general election as a 2-seat constituency (i.e. electing two Members of Parliament).  It was abolished for the 1885 general election.

Its namesake, a seat of about half the physical size of the above, took up a north-west side of the Severn estuary similar to the Forest of Dean, and came into being for the 1950 general election. It was abolished for the 1997 general election.

History
The 1950 to 1997 single-member constituency was held by the Labour Party from its creation in 1950 until 1979 and then held by the Conservative Party until its abolition.

Boundaries

1832 to 1885 

1832–1885: The Hundreds of Berkeley, Thornbury, Langley and Swineshead, Grumbald's Ash, Pucklechurch, Lancaster Duchy, Botloe, St Briavel's, Westbury, and Bledisloe, and the parts of the Hundreds of Henbury and Barton Regis that are not included in the limits of the City of Bristol.

The place of election was the small town of Dursley. This was where the hustings were put up and electors voted (by spoken declaration in public, before the secret ballot was introduced in 1872).

The qualification to vote in county elections, in the period, was to be a 40 shilling freeholder.

The county's five parliamentary boroughs were all in East Gloucestershire. Qualified freeholders from those boroughs could vote in the eastern county division. Bristol was a "county of itself", so its freeholders qualified to vote in the borough, not in a county division.

There were no electors qualified to vote in the western division, because they were freehold owners of land in a parliamentary borough.

1950 to 1997 
1950–1983: The Rural Districts of East Dean, Lydney, Newent, and West Dean, and part of the Rural District of Gloucester.

1983–1997: The District of Forest of Dean, and the Borough of Tewkesbury wards of Brockworth Glebe, Brockworth Moorfield, Brockworth Westfield, Churchdown Brookfield, Churchdown Parton, Churchdown Pirton, De Winton, Haw Bridge, Highnam, Horsbere, and Innsworth.

The constituency in this period was a smaller part of the county of Gloucestershire than its nineteenth century namesake. It was centred on the Forest of Dean, and indeed the majority of the constituency at abolition formed the new Forest of Dean constituency. About a fifth of the constituency moved to Tewkesbury, with 735 constituents moving to Gloucester.

Members of Parliament

MPs 1832–1885

MPs 1950–1997

Election results

Election in the 1990s

Elections in the 1980s

Elections in the 1970s

Elections in the 1960s

Elections in the 1950s

Elections in the 1880s

 Caused by Kingscote's appointment as Commissioner of Woods, Forests and Land Revenues.

Elections in the 1870s

Elections in the 1860s

 

 Caused by Rolt's appointment as a judge of the Court of Appeal in Chancery

 Caused by Rolt's appointment as Attorney General for England and Wales.

Elections in the 1850s

 

Appointment of Kingscote as a Groom in Waiting to Her Majesty Queen Victoria

Elections in the 1840s

Elections in the 1830s

 

 

Succession of Henry Somerset to the Peerage as 7th Duke of Beaufort

See also 
List of parliamentary constituencies in Gloucestershire

Notes and references

Sources 
 British Parliamentary Election Results 1832-1885, compiled and edited by F. W. S. Craig (Macmillan Press 1977)
 The Parliaments of England by Henry Stooks Smith (1st edition published in three volumes 1844–50), second edition edited (in one volume) by F. W. S. Craig (Political Reference Publications 1973))
 Who's Who of British Members of Parliament: Volume I 1832-1885, edited by M. Stenton (The Harvester Press 1976)

Politics of Gloucestershire
Parliamentary constituencies in South West England (historic)
Constituencies of the Parliament of the United Kingdom established in 1832
Constituencies of the Parliament of the United Kingdom disestablished in 1885
Constituencies of the Parliament of the United Kingdom established in 1950
Constituencies of the Parliament of the United Kingdom disestablished in 1997